Otaku Unite! is a 2004 documentary film by Eric Bresler on American fans of Japanese culture, specifically anime and manga, known as otaku.

Summary
Otaku Unite! provides a history of otaku-fandom and an introduction to anime conventions, with a focus on the fans themselves.  A variety of individuals are featured throughout interviews, including anime voice actors such as Corinne Orr and Peter Fernandez, industry representatives, convention directors and a plethora of "otaku" anime fans.

Production
Initially Bresler had planned to create a short, 15-minute film. Filming turned into a -year project, culminating in a near-feature-length film. Extras on the DVD come to 130 minutes.

Reception
Otaku Unite! has been shown at a number of anime conventions, as well as film festivals including the 2004 Philadelphia Film Festival. Otaku Unite! has been translated into Japanese and Russian and was featured in the May 2006 issue of the Japanese lifestyle magazine  Cyzo.

See also
Cosplay, a predominant form of fandom featured in the film.

References

External links
ToonZone Interview with Bresler
Anime News Network - Otaku Unite! Review
Otaku Unite! at the Internet Movie Database

2004 films
Central Park Media
American independent films
Documentary films about comics
Documentary films about fandom
2000s English-language films
2000s American films